The International Journal of Computational Methods has been published by World Scientific since 2004. It covers modern computational methods, such as optimizations, interpolations and approximation techniques and real-time computation. It aims for interdisciplinary coverage of real-life applications, whether in theoretical, simulated forms or actual programming.

The current Chief Editors are G.R. Liu, R.C. Batra, G. Yagawa, E. Oñate, and Z.H. Zhong.

Abstracting and indexing 
The journal is abstracted and indexed in Science Citation Index Expanded, Journal Citation Reports/Science Edition, Zentralblatt MATH, Compendex, and Inspec.

External links 
 

World Scientific academic journals
Computer science journals
Publications established in 2004
English-language journals